Reshetnikovo is the name of several inhabited localities in Russia.

Modern localities
Urban localities
Reshetnikovo, Moscow Oblast, a work settlement in Klinsky District of Moscow Oblast; 

Rural localities
Reshetnikovo, Chuvash Republic, a village in Attikovskoye Rural Settlement of Kozlovsky District in the Chuvash Republic
Reshetnikovo, Kirov Oblast, a village in Rodyginsky Rural Okrug of Sovetsky District in Kirov Oblast; 
Reshetnikovo, Leningrad Oblast, a village in Pervomayskoye Settlement Municipal Formation of Vyborgsky District in Leningrad Oblast; 
Reshetnikovo, Omsk Oblast, a village in Takmyksky Rural Okrug of Bolsherechensky District in Omsk Oblast; 
Reshetnikovo, Bezhanitsky District, Pskov Oblast, a village in Bezhanitsky District of Pskov Oblast
Reshetnikovo, Opochetsky District, Pskov Oblast, a village in Opochetsky District of Pskov Oblast
Reshetnikovo, Velikoluksky District, Pskov Oblast, a village in Velikoluksky District of Pskov Oblast
Reshetnikovo, Gagarinsky District, Smolensk Oblast, a village in Yelninskoye Rural Settlement of Gagarinsky District in Smolensk Oblast
Reshetnikovo, Novoduginsky District, Smolensk Oblast, a village in Kapustinskoye Rural Settlement of Novoduginsky District in Smolensk Oblast
Reshetnikovo, Udmurt Republic, a village in Nyneksky Selsoviet of Mozhginsky District in the Udmurt Republic
Reshetnikovo, Kichmengsko-Gorodetsky District, Vologda Oblast, a village in Kichmengsky Selsoviet of Kichmengsko-Gorodetsky District in Vologda Oblast
Reshetnikovo, Sokolsky District, Vologda Oblast, a village in Nesterovsky Selsoviet of Sokolsky District in Vologda Oblast
Reshetnikovo, Vologodsky District, Vologda Oblast, a village in Borisovsky Selsoviet of Vologodsky District in Vologda Oblast

Alternative names
Reshetnikovo, alternative name of Reshotkino, a village under the administrative jurisdiction of the Town of Klin in Klinsky District of Moscow Oblast;